Brazoria arenaria, common name sand Brazos-mint, is a plant in the family Lamiaceae, first described in 1945. It is endemic to southern Texas.

References

Lamiaceae
Endemic flora of Texas
Plants described in 1945
Flora without expected TNC conservation status